Mamady Doumbouya (N'Ko: , born 4 March 1980) is a Guinean military officer serving as the interim president of Guinea since 1 October 2021. Doumbouya led a coup d'état on 5 September 2021 that overthrew the previous president, Alpha Condé. He is a member of the Guinean Special Forces Group and a former French legionnaire. On the day of the coup, Doumbouya issued a broadcast on state television declaring that his faction had dissolved the government and constitution. On 1 October 2021, Doumbouya was sworn in as interim president.

Early life 
Doumbouya was born on 4 March 1980 in the Kankan Region of Guinea. He is of Mandinka origins.

Military career 
Doumbouya was a French legionnaire holding the rank of corporal before he returned to Guinea to lead the Special Forces Group, an elite military unit created by President Alpha Condé. When he took office, receiving promotion to the rank of battalion commander, his international experience was cited, including training he had completed in a number of different countries. In 2018, he met Assimi Goïta, from Mali, in Burkina Faso at a US Army training session for regional special forces commanders. Both he and Assimi Goïta would later launch military coups against their governments. He worked in this role for country's intelligence services, based in Forécariah. He was further promoted to lieutenant colonel in 2019 and to colonel in 2020. In 2021, he was said to have been seeking more authority for the Special Forces Group.

Doumbouya was deployed on missions to Afghanistan, Ivory Coast, Djibouti, Central African Republic, Israel, Cyprus, the UK and Guinea, during his 15-year career.

He was one of 25 officials from Guinea that the European Union threatened to sanction over allegations of human rights abuses.

In May 2021, there were rumors stemming from the government of a possible arrest of Doumbouya while he was in Conakry on unknown accusations or charges.

2021 coup d'état 
Doumbouya was the instigator of the 5 September 2021 Guinean coup d'état, in which the president of Guinea, Alpha Condé, was detained. Doumbouya issued a broadcast on state television declaring that his faction had dissolved the government and constitution. He also said that the "National Committee of Reconciliation and Development (CNRD), [was forced] to take its responsibility" after "the dire political-situation of our country, the instrumentalization of the judiciary, the non-respect of democratic principles, the extreme politicization of public administration, as well as poverty and corruption." In justifying the military's actions, Doumbouya quoted the former Ghanaian president Jerry Rawlings, who said that "if the people are crushed by their elites, it is up to the army to give the people their freedom."

As leader of Guinea 
On 18 September 2021, Doumbouya downplayed possible economic sanctions by ECOWAS, saying through a spokesman that "as soldiers, their work is in Guinea and there is nothing to freeze in their accounts." The ECOWAS representatives also urged the junta to allow ousted president Condé to leave Guinea; the junta has refused to do so.

He announced plans to "refound the state" introducing "free, credible and transparent" elections and respecting "all the national and international commitments to which the country has subscribed".

Under the current roadmap to restoring civilian rule, Doumbouya will not be allowed to run in future elections.

Personal life 
Doumbouya is married to Lauriane Doumbouya, who is an active duty member of the French National Gendarmerie. The couple have four children.

References 

Year of birth unknown
Living people
Guinean military personnel
Leaders who took power by coup
Colonels (military rank)
People from Kankan Region
People of Mandinka descent
Soldiers of the French Foreign Legion
Presidents of Guinea
1980 births